Matko Mijael Miljevic (born May 9, 2001) is an American professional soccer player who plays as an attacking midfielder for Major League Soccer club CF Montréal.

Club career
Prior to signing for Argentinos Juniors in 2011, Miljevic had a short stint with the Boca Juniors academy. The 2018–19 campaign saw the midfielder appear in senior football, firstly as an unused substitute for league fixtures with Tigre and Huracán in November/December 2018. Miljevic was named as a substitute for a Copa de la Superliga round of sixteen match against San Lorenzo in the succeeding April, subsequently making his professional bow in a 1–0 first leg win at the Estadio Diego Armando Maradona. His Primera División debut arrived on August 26 versus Huracán, while his first goal came on August 31 against Gimnasia y Esgrima.

On August 20, 2021, it was announced that Miljevic signed a 3 and half year contract with CF Montréal.

International career
Miljevic is eligible to play for Argentina, Bosnia and Herzegovina, Croatia, or the United States at international level. He played for latter's U16s at the 2017 Montaigu Tournament, before appearing for the Argentina U20s in a friendly with Uruguay in August 2018. July 2019 saw Miljevic receive a call-up from the Argentina U18s for the L'Alcúdia International Tournament in Spain. He scored on matchdays one/two against Mauritania and Spain respectively. In August 2019, Tab Ramos called Miljevic up for September friendlies with the United States U20s, but Argentinos denied his release. On January 8, 2020, Miljevic was released to the United States U20s for January friendlies where he made 2 appearances against the Mexico U20s.

Personal life
Miljevic was born in Miami, Florida after his parents had moved to the United States due to the 1998–2002 Argentine great depression. He is of Croatian descent, via his grandfather who was born in Banja Luka (now Bosnia and Herzegovina). He began the process of applying for a Croatian passport in 2018. Miljevic took part in taekwondo as a youngster, notably winning the Argentina Open in 2014 and 2015.

Career statistics

References

External links

2001 births
Living people
Soccer players from Miami
American soccer players
United States men's youth international soccer players
Argentine footballers
Argentina youth international footballers
Argentina under-20 international footballers
American people of Argentine descent
American people of Croatian descent
Argentine people of Croatian descent
Association football midfielders
American expatriate soccer players
Expatriate footballers in Argentina
American expatriate sportspeople in Argentina
Argentine Primera División players
Argentinos Juniors footballers
CF Montréal players
Major League Soccer players